Dil Ke Jharoke Main is a 1997 Bollywood musical romance film directed by Ashim Bhattacharya.

Plot 
Suman and Vijay Rai are two virtually inseparable school-going children. Both are heart-broken when Suman's dad decides to move out to a new location, both have tattooed a heart on their arms and hope to remember each other for the rest of their lives. Years later, they unknowingly meet each other, and this time Suman is married to Vijay's brother, Prakash (Mamik Singh), while Vijay is married to a rich and wealthy U.S. returned woman named Rita. Unfortunately, Prakash and Suman meet with an accident shortly after their marriage, but both recover. But Vijay's marriage with Rita is on the rocks due to incompatibility, with Rita moving out of Vijay's life. It is then Advocate Suresh, Suman's brother, comes across evidence that leads him to conclude that the couple was swapped by unknown person(s).

Cast 
 Vikas Bhalla as Vijay Munna Rai
 Manisha Koirala as Munni / Suman (Twins)
 Mamik Singh as Prakash Rai
 Satish Kaushik as Mac / Mohan Pahariya
 Kiran Kumar as Heera Pratap
 Kulbhushan Kharbanda as Mahendrapratap Rai
 Aparajita
 Chandrashekhar as Doctor
 Poonam Dasgupta
 Parvin Dastur Rita Pas Rakash / Rita Rai
 Baby Gazala as Munni
 Satyendra Kapoor as Satya Pratap
 Ram Mohan as College Principal
 Anjana Mumtaz as Mrs. Mahendrapratap Rai
 Amita Nangia as Julie (Mac's wife)
 Sudhir Pandey as Surendra Prakash (Rita's dad)
 Shashi Puri as Advocate Suresh
 Sanjivini
 Shivraj as Kashi (Surendra's butler)

Music 

The music is composed by Bappi Lahiri, while the songs are written by Majrooh Sultanpuri.

References

External links 
 
 Dil Ke Jharoke Main (1997) at movietalkies.com

1997 films
1990s Hindi-language films
Films scored by Bappi Lahiri